Yiannakis Theophani "John" Christodoulou (born 24 May 1965) is a Monaco-based British billionaire property developer, the owner of Yianis Group, a privately held company with a portfolio of residential, hotel, retail and leisure properties in the UK and Europe. His Yianis Group employs over 7,000 people in the UK alone. As of May 2021, Christodoulou's estimated net worth is £2.35 billion. Through Yianis Group, Christodoulou is reportedly one of England's biggest freeholder landlords.

Early life
Christodoulou was born on 24 May 1965 in Nicosia, Cyprus. He came to London as a boy in 1974, as his family fled the Turkish invasion of Cyprus. Aged 9 when Christodoulou found refuge in the UK, his father declined a council flat, forgoing the security of a lifelong tenancy for renting in a safer neighbourhood to protect him. Christodoulou's refugee background has had a profound impact on his outlook on life and approach to business: "I know what it is like to leave your home and have nothing else. What made me the man I am today is going through the experience of a war and being insecure. I'm still insecure. I can use it as a positive because it's never enough, you always need challenges in life."

Career
After leaving school at 16, Christodoulou trained to become a diamond mounter before acquiring his first property in 1994. He began his business career in Hatton Garden, persuading the landlord of a small jewelers to allow him to occupy a workshop by accepting cut-price jewellery repairs as a form of rental income. Within three years, Christodoulou had sold his own diamond business. Christodoulou then moved into the building trade by taking jobs on construction sites before developing his own buildings with generous bank finance.

He started at 19 with a studio flat in Finchley, north London, and now owns extensive property in London Docklands through his Yianis Group. With circa 2 million square foot of property, Christodoulou is the second largest freeholder in Canary Wharf after Canary Wharf Group, which is jointly owned by Canadian private equity firm Brookfield and the Qatar Investment Authority.

Christodoulou owns 100% of Yianis Group, which owns the London hotels Marriott Canary Wharf and the Canary Riverside Plaza (formerly Four Seasons Canary Wharf). He also owns heritage asset Wool House, a grade II listed former Victorian warehouse in Whitechapel. In 2019, it was reported that the Cyprus-born British freehold tycoon was working on an eco-friendly development on an island off Sardinia.

In 2012, several overleveraged hotel-owning Yianis Group interests that came under the Dania Properties name went into administration, which saw Christodoulou lose the grade 2-listed 148 bedroom hotel Marriott Victoria & Albert Hotel in Manchester and the four-AA-star, 895-bedroom Park Inn by Radisson located close to Heathrow Airport.

The value of Christodoulou's property holdings increased by 25% in the 12 months to April 2019 to £1.5 billion, due to a buoyant London rental market.

As of May 2022, his net worth is £2.35 billion, according to the Sunday Times Rich List 2022.

In October 2021, Christodoulou had been set to take over Cypriot professional football club Omonia Nicosia from current major stakeholder Stavros Papastavrou, a New York-based Cypriot investor, in a £30 million deal, but talks reportedly broke down over the issue of him having to sell the shares on to Omonia fans after five years, one of at least two clauses in the original management deal with Papastavrou that Christodoulou had sought to scrub.

Personal life
Christodoulou lives in Monaco with his wife and four children. For his 40th birthday, he acquired a private jet and, when he turned 50, Christodoulou increased the size of his yacht from 50 metres to 74.5 meters. He has a $50 million 74m yacht, Zeus, previously owned by Aidan Barclay.

He is a supporter of Omonia Nicosia. His favourite drink is Zivania. The property entrepreneur is also dyslexic and accordingly has a preference for making business decisions over the phone, an in-house solicitor for Yianis Group has told London's High Court.

Honours and philanthropy
Christodoulou won the "Foreign-based Cypriot Entrepreneur of the Year 2013" award from IN Business Magazine.

Christodoulou is the president of the Monaco and Cyprus Jubilee Sailing Trust.

In June 2022, he was awarded a Goodwill Ambassador Award of the Principality of Monaco.

Christodoulou received the Holy Humanitarian Cross of the Greek Orthodox Church of Cyprus in July 2022, while in early August 2022 he was awarded the Medal of Outstanding Contribution in a ceremony organised by the Presidency of the Republic of Cyprus.

Yianis Christodoulou Foundation 
Christodoulou is involved in philanthropic endeavours. Inspired by his own childhood, displaced from his homeland as a child, in 2016 he founded the Yianis Christodoulou Foundation (YCF), which seeks to support disadvantaged children and their families in the UK and abroad, with a special focus on poverty alleviation and education. 

Christodoulou has donated £1 million to the eponymous philanthropy organisation.

The charity commenced in 2017 with donations of £51,842 and in 2018 donations totalled £1,200,559. Fundraising fell significantly in 2019, with just £17,756 raised. In 2020 donations totalled £15,238. Charitable grants made to date are: £260,998 (2018), £112,039 (2019) and £93,199 (2020).

He has hosted fundraising events, such as the 2017 Star Ball at the Hilton Manchester Deansgate where apparently over £1.5 million was raised. It is unclear whether this sum is separate to the £1 million said to have been donated by Christodoulou as the accounts filed with Companies House indicate donations/funds raised since 2017 total £1,285,395.

In July 2021, Christodoulou sailed Zeus to Cyprus where the Foundation raised €365,000 to support the island country's disadvantaged children as well as local schools destroyed by wildfires. 

The Foundation backed King Charles III, then heir apparent to the British throne as Prince of Wales, at a charity event in Dumfries House, in Ayrshire, Scotland.

COVID-19 pandemic

The Foundation funded the distribution of free food packages offered to the homes of 355,000 members of the Cypriot community in the UK for the in need, vulnerable and elderly during the COVID-19 pandemic. It also funded 6,000 individual care packs for the NHS staff at The Royal London Hospital, Whitechapel, London. In 2021, Christodoulou stood alongside Monaco ruler Prince Albert as he opened a new gym facility for staff of the Princess Grace Hospital Centre which had been built and paid for by the Foundation.

2022 Russian invasion of Ukraine

Yianis Group offered two of its hotels for free to home 750 Ukrainian refugees from the Ukraine war, for a year. The two hotels in question are the Radisson Blu Hotel in Liverpool and the Palace Park Inn in Southend-on-Sea, Essex. Christodoulou gave support to the UK government's flagship Homes for Ukraine scheme and urged families and businesses everywhere in the UK to ‘get involved and do their bit’. He said he was providing the accommodation for free because "as a child, I know what pain my parents went through", who fled Cyprus due to the Turkish invasion of Cyprus.

Tommy Foster Racing sponsorship

In March 2022, the Foundation entered into a sponsorship deal with the Tommy Foster Racing team. The team’s main driver Tommy Foster is a Cornish racing prodigy. The team competes in the Le Mans Cup and enjoyed a podium finish with third place in the opening 2022 cup. The YCF livery and support for Tommy Foster racing team aligns with the organisation's aims to support the physical and mental development of gifted young people, especially those from working class backgrounds.

Controversies
Christodoulou's business practices have attracted considerable media attention. The Times notes that "his company has been challenged by residents of a luxury development of more than 300 flats who complained they were being charged sky-high service charges and unreasonably high sums for repairs." This is a reference to Canary Riverside, where Christodoulou was stripped of day-to-day management control over the property in October 2016, with a professional court appointee installed to act in the best interests of the site. Leaseholders were able to prove fault against CREM, a subsidiary company, that they had suffered over many years due to poor management of the estate, in particular a lack of transparency surrounding how their money was being used. Tribunal judges found that the managing agent Marathon Estates (a company set-up in 2011 by Richard Paul, a chartered accountant and partner at accountancy firm Nyman Libson Paul, to manage the Christodoulou-owned estates of Canary Riverside and 1 West India Quay) "has been unable to produce accurate financial information on time, including budgets and accounts, has not engaged with leaseholders and has a muddled hierarchy of command."

Similar complaints of estate mismanagement by Christodoulou leaseholders at 1 West India Quay have emerged in a Sunday Times feature on the so-called leasehold property scandal. Leaseholders there have taken legal action against Christodoulou over expensive energy bills, raising concerns that they have been subsidising his commercial interest on the site. In May 2014, they won the right to form a recognised residents' association, despite Christodoulou having hired a QC and spent £74,000 in trying to block their efforts. In 2022, it was reported that Christodoulou had admitted before a tribunal that he had overcharged the 1 West India Quay flat owners by 26% on utilities, wrongly adding commercial rate VAT and a climate change levy to their bills for heating, cooling and hot water.

Christodoulou has also been named in parliament, with former MP for Poplar and Limehouse Jim Fitzpatrick claiming that the litigation and threats faced by the court-appointed manager at Canary Riverside are "little short of harassment". A former secretary of the 1 West India Quay residents' association has been subjected to a defamation threat by Christodoulou's lawyers, as have more than 100 leaseholders at neighbouring Canary Riverside. In July 2018, his lawyers unsuccessfully sought to prevent the then local MP, Jim Fitzpatrick, from raising the case of Canary Riverside in parliament. It had been claimed that Fitzpatrick's intervention could breach sub judice rules.

In April 2020, The Guardian reported that tenants at Olympic House, Simpson House and St John's Court in Somerford Grove, east London, were denied a 20% rent cut, in spite of the COVID-19 pandemic and their allegedly precarious employment situations. The renters are said to have been told by the lettings agent, acting on behalf of the three corporate landlords all “majority owned” by Christodoulou, that the request was “unreasonable” and “unrealistic”. The agent had suggested that “any drop in tenants’ income would be minimised by a reduction in spending on holidays, entertainment, travel, clothes and lunches.” London mayor Sadiq Khan tweeted: “This is a prime example of how unrealistic it is to expect landlords & tenants to sort difficulties out amongst themselves,” and that the story is “exactly why” he is calling on government to “introduce immediate measures to protect tenants who go into arrears” because of the public health emergency. These tenants formed an advocacy group Somerford Grove Renters with the London Renters Union. They were later threatened with legal action by the lettings agent and alleged harassment and surveillance by agent-hired security guards. After continuing to make public statements about the situation, several tenants received eviction notices in August in what Hackney Mayor Philip Glanville called a "revenge eviction" and "a direct response to [the tenants] seeking greater security for themselves and their neighbours at a time of crisis."

On 21 September 2020, around 70 rental and leasehold tenants protested outside Canary Riverside Plaza, which is part of the upmarket mixed use Canary Riverside scheme owned by the Yianis Group, to push back against unfair practices by Christodoulou and the government's ending of the eviction ban. Joined by local MP Apsana Begum, the protesters hand-delivered a letter to the Yianis Group headquarters.

On 9 November 2020, former shadow home secretary Diane Abbott tabled an early day motion in parliament urging John Christodoulou to negotiate "fair and reasonable rent adjustments" with affected tenants in Somerford Grove. It noted that "far from entering into negotiations, residents have been harassed and spied on".

In July 2021, it was reported that a tribunal had ordered Christodoulou to compensate four of his former tenants in Somerford Grove £19,000 for renting them properties as illegal HMOs. In June 2022, the Upper Tribunal heard an appeal by the landlord where the tenants won again, increasing the award to £22,500 and permitting an application for costs due to the landlord withdrawing from the appeal at a "late stage without any explanation". The judge noted that the Mr Christodoulou's landlord companies could not produce gas safety or energy efficiency certificates in addition to not obtaining the property licences required by law and concluded from this that "the Landlord’s business practices involved a systematic or institutional neglect of regulatory requirements".

In August 2022, the Upper Tribunal in a different case ordered that Mr Christodoulou’s landlord company at Canary Riverside, Riverside CREM 3 Limited, pay £67,000 towards the legal costs of the independent court-appointed manager and the leaseholders at the site for its “unreasonable” conduct, having instigated a meritless appeal to the Upper Tribunal while  conducting the appeal in a manner that was also deemed unreasonable, inexplicably advancing a new legal point at a very late stage in the proceedings that should have been used in the original case, if used at all. The Upper Tribunal determined that “the decision to do so can only have been taken with a view to impressing on the respondents the appellant’s determination not to back down, whatever the cost and thereby to harass and intimidate some or all of them.” The costs order continued: “This litigation is being conducted with the intensity and expense and in the style of commercial litigation … the [Landlord] has full access to the FTT and to the [Upper] Tribunal and appears to be prepared to spend whatever it takes to promote its interests through litigation. The proposed [costs] order is not required to punish the appellant but to protect the respondents from its unreasonable conduct”. In the appeal hearing, the landlord was reportedly admonished by Deputy Chamber President Judge Martin Rodger KC for an “extremely unattractive” approach to tribunal. Mr Christodoulou had sought to resile from Canary Riverside’s management order for independent and transparent estate management and also attempted to force the residential flat leaseholders to pay the £355,000 unpaid debt of a commercial tenant, Virgin Active, which had wiped out rent and service charge arrears at High Court as part of a restructuring and cross-class cram down. 

Christodoulou has been described as a "tax exile", and for a number of years lived in the UK enjoying the controversial non-domiciled tax status. He left the UK shortly before then chancellor of the exchequer Alistair Darling was to introduce a new £30,000 a year charge on nondoms who have lived in the country for more than seven years. In October 2021, The Times newspaper reported that the low-profile billionaire property tycoon had covertly claimed millions of furlough money from the taxpayer despite telling a London audience that he was self-reliant through the crisis and criticising those businesses which did need government assistance. Christodoulou’s use of shell and foreign incorporated companies to secure up to £6.5 million in taxpayer money occurred despite his public comment that “we borrowed no money from the government … because it shows the wrong sign.” After legal letters from Christodoulou's solicitors, Cypriot media outlets Knews, the English edition of Kathimerini Cyprus, and Economy Today apologised to Christodoulou for publishing the Times of London's furlough story and agreed that "it is clear that the funds received by Christodoulou’s companies from state support schemes were solely for the benefit of the companies’ employees. The funds did not benefit the companies themselves or Christodoulou personally. Neither Christodoulou nor his companies have received any loans from the government. The participation of some of Christodoulou’s companies in state support schemes was exclusively for the purpose of supporting employees whose employment was suspended due to pandemic-related restrictions that had been imposed". By contrast, The Times article has not been withdrawn following Christodoulou's legal complaint that it is defamatory and untrue.

In December 2022, a property tribunal ruled in the Canary Riverside case that John Christodoulou landlord companies, CREM and Octagon, misappropriated approximately £1.6 million in secret insurance commissions from flat owners. This represented leaseholder overcharging of between £150,000 to £200,000 per annum. The tribunal heard that Westminster Management Services is the employing entity of all Yianis Group personnel. Christodoulou and WMS were unable to demonstrate that the payments were legitimate and could not produce any contract with the insurers. The tribunal also heard that WMS was “just told” about the fees payable and the cash was then sent across by Reich, an  FCA regulated broker. The tribunal criticised Christodoulou's "complete lack of transparency with leaseholders regarding these commission payments paid since 2010" as "lamentable", while noting the "woefully inaccurate" disclosure originally provided by Reich, which understated its commission by almost half. The decision was reported in the Financial Times as a "rare victory in service charges" for UK leaseholders, a development it suggested lends support to a recent warning by the FCA that freeholders, managing agents and brokers “may be selecting insurance policies that maximise their own remuneration . . . rather than the policy that offers the best value for the leaseholders”.

References

1965 births
Living people
English billionaires
British corporate directors
Cypriot billionaires
People from Nicosia
Cypriot emigrants to England
Businesspeople from London
Naturalised citizens of the United Kingdom
English people of Greek Cypriot descent
British expatriates in Monaco
Cypriot expatriates in Monaco